Lucy Blue is a maritime archeologist who is a senior lecturer at Southampton University. She is known for co-presenting the BBC series Oceans.

Career
Blue graduated from Oxford University 1996 with a DPhil in Maritime Archaeology and is currently the  Southampton Maritime & Marine Institute theme leader at the Centre for Maritime Archaeology in Southampton.

References

External links
 Lucy Blue at ResearchGate
 Lucy Blue at WorldCat
 Lucy Blue at the Archaeology Data Service

Living people
Year of birth missing (living people)
Alumni of the University of Oxford
British women archaeologists